At least two ships of the French Navy have borne the name Sfax:

 , a protected cruiser launched in 1884 and stricken in 1906
 , a  launched in 1934 and sunk in 1940

French Navy ship names